Daaman Aur Aag is a 1973 Bollywood drama film. The film stars Sanjay Khan and Saira Banu.

Plot 
Unable to fulfill the necessity for his only son due to his extreme poverty, Shankar, along with his friends Pinto & Abdul start selling liquor and send his son abroad for higher education. What will happen when his son Raja will return from abroad & will know about this truth?

Cast
 Sanjay Khan as Raja
 Saira Banu as Rita
 Balraj Sahni as Shanker
 Anwar Hussain as Pintoo
 Rajendranath Malhotra as Butaram
 Indrani Mukherjee as Soni
 Mukri as Abdul
 Praveen Paul as Totaram's wife
 Madan Puri as Surajmal
 Zeb Rehman as Ganga
 K.N. Singh as Mr. Singh
 Sunder as Totaram

Soundtrack

External links
 

1973 films
1970s Hindi-language films
1973 drama films
Films scored by Shankar–Jaikishan
Indian drama films
Hindi-language drama films